Justice Adam Leak (born September 1, 1979) is an American film, television and stage actor best known for his portrayal of Harland Osbourne in the 2007 film The Great Debaters.

Early life
Leak was born and raised in Montgomery, Alabama by parents George, a police officer, and Doris, a middle school teacher at Lee Middle School in Newnan, GA. He attended Montgomery's Jefferson Davis High School and says he was very shy until he was chosen to lead the school's marching band as a drum major, which he cites as being "the beginning point for [him] coming out of [his] shell". He studied at a Texas university, but later transferred to Auburn University in Auburn, Alabama to study mass communication; when the communications program became low on funding, he changed his major to theatre arts. At Auburn's drama department, he was helping a student practicing her lines for an audition for The Crucible when the stage director approached Leak and told him that he should audition himself as he would suit one of the lead roles. He won the university's "Best Actor" award and was nominated for two Irene Ryan Awards for his numerous performances.

Career
After obtaining his degree from Auburn University, Leak relocated to Atlanta, Georgia. He was signed to an agency which landed him a number of roles in commercials (such as for Verizon Wireless), television shows, and independent films. He appeared in films such as Bobby Jones: Stroke of Genius, The Cure and Watermelon Honey, and television shows such as K-Ville, Moonlight and Women's Murder Club, which he described as his "training ground" for becoming a professional actor. His agent sent Leak's résumé to the producers of The Great Debaters. When he met Denzel Washington, the director and also an actor in The Great Debaters, in a follow-up callback audition, Leak says "It was one of those moments. I knew my life was about to change." He was given the role of Harland Osbourne, the Harvard University liaison who receives the Wiley College debate team. When he accepted the role in May 2007, he ended his acting stint on Atlanta's longest-running play, Peachtree Battle.

Leak appears in the 2008 film Balancing the Books, and stars in the 2012 film Implanted, which he completed before The Great Debaters and which he is most proud of.

Personal life
Leak and his older sister Liberty were named for their father's love of the criminal justice system. He is trained in ballet, jazz dance, videography and drum-playing.

Filmography

Film

Television

References

External links

1979 births
Living people
American male film actors
American male television actors
American male stage actors
Auburn University alumni
Male actors from Montgomery, Alabama